Alepino is a rural locality (a selo) in Rozhdestvenskoye Rural Settlement, Sobinsky District, Vladimir Oblast, Russia. The population was 16 as of 2010. There are 4 streets.

Geography 
Alepino is located 40 km northwest of Sobinka (the district's administrative centre) by road. Astanikha is the nearest rural locality.

References 

Rural localities in Sobinsky District
Yuryevsky Uyezd (Vladimir Governorate)